Neoaulonastus is a genus of mite.

Species
 Neoaulonastus grannatina Skoracki, Hromada & Unsoeld, 2013
 Neoaulonastus quelea Skoracki, Hromada & Unsoeld, 2013
 Neoaulonastus tanzanicus Skoracki, Hromada & Unsoeld, 2013

References

Trombidiformes